St Thomas Aquinas School is a parochial school and a client member of IEB in Witbank, South Africa, which has based its education on Catholic Church values and discipline.

References

External links

Religious schools in South Africa
Catholic schools in South Africa
Private schools in South Africa